Fredrik Eklund (born April 26, 1977) is a Swedish real estate broker, former IT entrepreneur, reality television star, and author. He is best known for starring in the Bravo reality series, Million Dollar Listing New York for all of its nine seasons. In 2015, Eklund released his book The Sell: The Secrets of Selling Anything to Anyone, which made The New York Times Best Seller list.

Early life and education
Eklund is the son of Klas Eklund, a senior economist at Swedish bank SEB, and brother of author Sigge Eklund. His paternal grandparents were Swedish actors Bengt Eklund and Fylgia Zadig.

Eklund had his first American experience as a foreign exchange student in Edina, Minnesota, where he attended Edina High School. After finishing high school, Eklund studied at the Stockholm School of Economics, but never graduated. He has worked for the financial newspaper Finanstidningen. At the age of 23, Eklund founded an Internet company with over 45 employees, and went on to work for the investment bank SEB in Stockholm, London, Singapore, and Tokyo before beginning his work in New York City.

Film career
In 2004, before arriving in New York City, Eklund acted in a number of pornographic films under the pseudonym Tag Eriksson (or Tag Ericsson). In an interview with Out Magazine, Eklund has said of this period, "It was only a week of my life, accumulated. It was spread out over a few months, so it was a very short period of my life. It was something that I tried and quickly decided that I was done with." Eklund went on to say in the interview that he is proud of who he is, that he does not regret anything, and that his past involvement in the pornographic film industry has not negatively affected his career.

Real estate career
Eklund has closed over five billion dollars in residential real estate. Eklund became Managing Director at the New York City real estate firm CORE Group Marketing and in 2010, alongside his business partner John Gomes, Managing Director at Prudential Douglas Elliman, the largest real estate brokerage on the East Coast. Eklund also started the top-selling team at Elliman.

Eklund is the founder of Eklund Stockholm New York, Scandinavia's most high-end residential real estate brokerage with 50 employees and $1 billion in closed sales in 2014. He is an active member of the Real Estate Board of New York.

Million Dollar Listing New York
The New York Times featured Eklund on the front page of the "Sunday Style" section in November 2010. He is one of five New York City brokers starring in Bravo's Million Dollar Listing New York.

On January 24, 2022, Fredrik Eklund announced his departure from the Million Dollar Listing franchise.

Personal life
On February 9, 2013, Eklund married artist Derek Kaplan on Little Palm Island in the Florida Keys. The couple lived in New York with their dogs Mouse and Fritzy until 2016. The couple have previously lived in Roxbury, Connecticut, to live in a mansion Eklund purchased, and in 2020 the family relocated from New York to Los Angeles. Eklund and Kaplan attempted to have children through surrogacy, but the surrogate suffered a miscarriage.

In November 2017, Eklund and Kaplan had twins via surrogate: daughter Milla and son Fredrik Jr.

Eklund is sober.

See also
 LGBT culture in New York City
 List of LGBT people from New York City

References

External links
 
 The Eklund Gomes Team - Douglas Elliman
 
 Eklund Stockholm New York
 Fredrik Eklund Keynote Speaker Bio Page 

21st-century Swedish novelists
Swedish male novelists
Stockholm School of Economics alumni
Swedish male pornographic film actors
Actors in gay pornographic films
Gay novelists
Gay pornographic film actors
Swedish LGBT novelists
Swedish gay actors
Swedish gay writers
Swedish emigrants to the United States
Swedish expatriates in the United States
1977 births
Living people
Businesspeople from Stockholm
Swedish people of German descent
Participants in American reality television series
Edina High School alumni